Just like Heaven  may refer to:

Just like Heaven (film), a 2005 romantic comedy starring Reese Witherspoon and Mark Ruffalo
Just Like Heaven (1930 film), a drama starring Anita Louise and David Newell
Just Like Heaven, a romance novel by  Julia Quinn
"Just Like Heaven" (The Cure song), 1987
"Just Like Heaven" (Brandon Lake song), 2020